The Chillerton Down transmitting station is a broadcasting facility for FM and DAB radio at Chillerton Down, above the village of Chillerton on the Isle of Wight off the south coast of England.

History

Construction
It was built by BICC.

Transmission
It was originally used to transmit Southern Television, and later TVS, until the end of VHF television transmissions in the UK at the beginning of 1985. It now transmits Wave 105, Capital South, Nation Radio South Coast, Isle of Wight Radio, the local Arqiva (NOW S. Hampshire) DAB multiplex and the national Digital One DAB multiplex.

The site is owned and operated by Arqiva.

Channels available by frequency

Analogue radio

Digital radio

Analogue television
VHF analogue television was transmitted from Chillerton Down from its launch in 1958 until the nationwide shutdown of VHF signals in 1985.

See also 
 List of masts
 List of tallest buildings and structures in Great Britain

References

External links 
The Transmission Gallery: photographs and information
Antenna picture
Chillerton Down Transmitter at thebigtower.com

Buildings and structures on the Isle of Wight
Transmitter sites in England
Towers on the Isle of Wight